Bishop of New Westminster may refer to:

 the Anglican Bishop of New Westminster
 the Roman Catholic Bishop of New Westminster, the former Diocese of New Westminster is now the Archdiocese of Vancouver, so the current title is Archbishop of Vancouver

See also